Frank Liddell (26 June 1862 – 20 October 1939) was an Australian politician. Born in Maitland, New South Wales, he was educated at Sydney Grammar School and subsequently attended the University of Edinburgh. He returned as a doctor to Maitland, and was elected to West Maitland Council. In 1903, he was elected to the Australian House of Representatives as the Free Trade Party member for Hunter, succeeding Prime Minister Edmund Barton, who had retired. He held the seat until 1910, when he was defeated by future Labor leader Matthew Charlton. Liddell subsequently retired from politics and returned to medicine, practicing in Maitland and Hornsby. He died in 1939.

References

Free Trade Party members of the Parliament of Australia
Members of the Australian House of Representatives for Hunter
Members of the Australian House of Representatives
1862 births
1939 deaths
People from Maitland, New South Wales
Commonwealth Liberal Party members of the Parliament of Australia
20th-century Australian politicians